Claude William Passeau (April 9, 1909 – August 30, 2003) was an American starting pitcher in Major League Baseball. From 1935 through 1947, Passeau played with the Pittsburgh Pirates (1935), Philadelphia Phillies (1936–39) and Chicago Cubs (1939–47). He batted and threw right-handed. In a 13-year career, Passeau posted a 162–150 record with 1,104 strikeouts and a 3.32 ERA in 2,179 innings.

Personal life
Passeau was a native of Waynesboro, Mississippi. He was a graduate of Millsaps College in Jackson, Mississippi, where he joined Kappa Sigma.
Passeau was considered the finest college quarterback in Mississippi, but he chose to pursue an athletic career in professional baseball rather than football after graduation.

Baseball career
Passeau started his career with the Pittsburgh Pirates, then played for several years with the Philadelphia Phillies at their notorious "bandbox" ballpark, Baker Bowl, before being traded to the Chicago Cubs, where he had several winning seasons.

Passeau surrendered the game-winning home run to Ted Williams in the 1941 All-Star Game.

Passeau's greatest individual performance came in Game 3 of the 1945 World Series, in which he pitched a one-hitter against the Detroit Tigers. Slugger Rudy York got the Tigers' only hit, in the second inning, and the Cubs took a 2-games-to-1 edge. Due to wartime travel restrictions that were still in place, despite the war having ended, the first three games were in Detroit and the last four in Chicago. Back in Wrigley Field, the Cubs lost three of four games, their last appearance in the Series until 2016. Passeau was the starting pitcher for the Cubs in Game 6, but had to be removed from the game during the sixth inning after he injured his pitching hand while fielding a hard smash. Passeau had a comfortable lead in the game, but the Chicago bullpen could not check the Tigers. The game went into extra innings and the Cubs emptied their bench. Hank Borowy, who was scheduled to pitch Game 7, was pressed into service and pitched four innings as Chicago won the game in twelve innings. Passeau's injury proved to be costly as the Cubs were without a well rested pitcher to face Hal Newhouser in the final game.

That one-hit game was only the second low-hit game in the history of the Series; the first was pitched by the Cubs' Ed Reulbach in 1906. There have only been four low-hit Series games since, including Don Larsen's perfect game in the 1956 World Series, and Roy Halladay's one walk no hitter in the 2010 NLDS, which are the only two no-hitters in MLB postseason history.

Passeau was a better than average hitting pitcher, as he had a career average of .192 (189–982), hitting 15 home runs and recording 80 RBI in a 13-year career. On May 19, 1941, he hit a grand slam home run and had 5 RBI in a 14–1 victory over the Dodgers. In the 1937, 1941 and 1942 seasons, he compiled 11, 12 and 10 RBI respectively.

Death
Passeau died on August 30, 2003, in Lucedale, Mississippi, aged 94.

See also
 List of Major League Baseball annual strikeout leaders
 List of Major League Baseball all-time leaders in home runs by pitchers

References

External links

The Deadball Era

1909 births
2003 deaths
Baseball players from Mississippi
Beaumont Exporters players
Centralia Cubs players
Charleston Senators players
Chicago Cubs players
Decatur Commodores players
Des Moines Demons players
Major League Baseball pitchers
Millsaps Majors baseball players
Minor league baseball managers
National League All-Stars
National League strikeout champions
People from Waynesboro, Mississippi
Philadelphia Phillies players
Pittsburgh Pirates players
Shreveport Sports players
Williamsport Grays players